The Hainan Island incident occurred on April 1, 2001, when a United States Navy EP-3E ARIES II signals intelligence aircraft and a Chinese J-8II interceptor jet collided in mid-air, resulting in an international dispute between the United States and China (PRC).

A collision between the EP-3 and one of the J-8s caused a PRC pilot to go missing (later presumed dead); the EP-3 was forced to make an emergency landing on Hainan without approved permission from the Chinese authorities. The 24 crew members were detained and interrogated by Chinese authorities until a statement was delivered by the United States government regarding the incident. The exact phrasing of this document was intentionally ambiguous and allowed both countries to save face while defusing a potentially volatile situation between the United States and the People's Republic of China.

Background
This sea area includes the South China Sea Islands, which are claimed by the PRC and several other countries. It is one of the most strategically sensitive areas in the world.

The United States and the People's Republic of China disagree on the legality of the overflights by U.S. naval aircraft of the area where the incident occurred. This part of the South China Sea comprises part of the PRC's exclusive economic zone based on the United Nations Convention on the Law of the Sea (UNCLOS) and the Chinese claim that the Paracel Islands belong to China. This claim was acknowledged by Vietnam in 1958 but it has since reversed itself to contest the claim after the end of the Vietnam War in 1975. The United States remains neutral in this dispute, but patrols the sea regularly with military ships and airplanes, during what it terms "freedom of navigation" operations. The PRC interprets the convention as allowing it to preclude other nations' military operations within this area, but the United States does not recognize China's claim for the Paracel Islands and maintains that the Convention grants free navigation for all countries' aircraft and ships, including military aircraft and ships, within a country's exclusive economic zone. Although the United States is not party to UNCLOS, it has accepted and complies with nearly all of the treaty's provisions.

A PRC Sukhoi Su-27 force is based at Hainan. The island also houses a large signals intelligence facility that tracks civil and military activity in the area and monitors traffic from commercial communications satellites. The United States has long kept the island under surveillance; on May 22, 1951, for example, RAF Spitfire PR Mk 19s out of Hong Kong's Kai Tak Airport flew photo-reconnaissance missions at the behest of U.S. naval intelligence.

In the air
On April 1, 2001, the EP-3 (BuNo 156511), assigned to Fleet Air Reconnaissance Squadron One (VQ-1, "World Watchers"), had taken off as Mission PR32 from Kadena Air Base in Okinawa, Japan. Two Chinese J-8s from Hainan's Lingshui airfield approached. One of the J-8s (81192), piloted by Lt. Cdr. Wang Wei, made two close passes to the EP-3. On the third pass, it collided with the larger aircraft. The J-8 broke into two pieces; the EP-3's radome detached completely and its No. 1 (outer left) propeller was damaged severely. Airspeed and altitude data were lost, the aircraft depressurized, and an antenna became wrapped around the tailplane. The J-8's tail fin struck the EP-3's left aileron, forcing it fully upright, and causing the U.S. aircraft to roll to the left at three to four times its normal maximum rate.

The impact sent the EP-3 into a 30° dive at a bank angle of 130°, almost inverted. It dropped  in 30 seconds, and fell another  before the pilot, Lt. Shane Osborn, got the EP-3's wings level and the nose up. In a September 2003 article in Naval Aviation News, Osborn said that once he regained control of the aircraft, he "called for the crew to prepare to bail out". He then managed to control the aircraft's descent by using emergency power on the working engines, allowing him to plan an emergency landing on Hainan.

For the next 26 minutes, the crew of the EP-3 performed an emergency plan which included destroying sensitive items aboard the aircraft, such as electronic equipment related to intelligence-gathering, documents and data. Part of this plan involved pouring freshly brewed coffee into disk drives and motherboards and using an axe from the plane's survival kit to destroy hard drives. The crew had not been formally trained on how to destroy sensitive documents and equipment, and so improvised. As a result of the destruction, the plane's interior was later described as resembling "the aftermath of a frat party".

The EP-3 made an unauthorized emergency landing at Lingshui airfield, after at least 15 distress signals had gone unanswered, with the emergency code selected on the transponder. After the collision, the failure of the nose cone had disabled the No. 3 (inner right) engine, and the No. 1 propeller could not be feathered, resulting in increased drag on that side. There was no working airspeed indicator or altimeter, and Osborn used full right aileron during the landing. The surviving Chinese interceptor had landed there 10 minutes earlier.

Lt. Cdr. Wang was seen to eject after the collision, but the Pentagon said that the damage to the underside of the EP-3 could mean that the cockpit of the Chinese fighter jet was crushed, making it impossible for the pilot to survive. Wang's body was never recovered, and he was presumed dead.

Cause of collision

Both the cause of the collision and the assignment of blame were disputed. The U.S. government stated that the Chinese jet bumped the wing of the larger, slower, and less maneuverable EP-3. After returning to U.S. soil, the pilot of the EP-3, Lt. Shane Osborn, was allowed to make a brief statement in which he said that the EP-3 was on autopilot and in straight-and-level flight at the time of the collision. He stated that he was just "guarding the autopilot" in his interview with Frontline. The U.S. released video footage from previous missions which revealed that American reconnaissance crews had previously been intercepted by the same aircraft.

Based on the account of Wang Wei's wingman, the Chinese government stated that the American aircraft "veered at a wide angle towards the Chinese", in the process ramming the J-8.  This claim cannot be verified since the Chinese government did not release data from the flight recorders of either aircraft, both of which are in its possession.

On the ground
For 15 minutes after landing, the EP-3 crew continued to destroy sensitive items and data on board the aircraft, as per protocol. They disembarked from the aircraft after soldiers looked through windows, pointed guns, and shouted through bullhorns. The Chinese offered them water and cigarettes. Guarded closely, they were taken to a military barracks at Lingshui where they were interrogated for two nights before being moved to lodgings in Haikou, the provincial capital and largest city on the island. They were generally treated well, but were interrogated at all hours, and so suffered from lack of sleep. They found the Chinese food unpalatable as it included fish heads, but this later improved. Guards gave them decks of cards and an English-language newspaper. To pass the time and keep spirits up, Lts. Honeck and Vignery worked up humorous routines based on the television shows The People's Court, Saturday Night Live and The Crocodile Hunter. These were performed as they went to meals, the only time they were together. They gradually developed good relations with their guards, with one guard inquiring of them the lyrics for the song "Hotel California" by the Eagles.

Three U.S. diplomats were sent to Hainan to meet the crew and assess their conditions, and to negotiate their release. They were first allowed to meet with the crew three days after the collision. U.S. officials complained about the slow pace of the Chinese decision.

The 24 crew members (21 men and 3 women) were detained for 10 days in total, and were released soon after the U.S. issued the "letter of the two sorries" to the Chinese. The crew was only partially successful in their destruction of classified material, and some of the material they failed to destroy included cryptographic keys, signals intelligence manuals, and the names of National Security Agency employees. Some of the captured computers contained detailed information for processing PROFORMA communications from North Korea, Russia, Vietnam, China and other countries. The plane also carried information on the emitter parameters for U.S.-allied radar systems worldwide. The fact that the United States could track People's Liberation Army Navy submarines via signal transmission was also revealed to China.

Letter of the two sorries

The "Letter of the two sorries" was the letter delivered by the United States Ambassador Joseph Prueher to Foreign Minister Tang Jiaxuan of the People's Republic of China to end the incident. The delivery of the letter resulted in the release of the U.S. crew from Chinese custody, as well as the eventual return of the disassembled aircraft.

The letter stated that the United States was "very sorry" for the death of Chinese pilot Wang Wei, and was "very sorry" the aircraft entered China's airspace and that its landing did not have "verbal clearance".

The United States stated that it was "not a letter of apology", as some state-owned Chinese media outlets characterized it at the time, but "an expression of regret and sorrow". China had originally asked for an apology, but the U.S. explained, "We did not do anything wrong, and therefore it was not possible to apologize".

There was further debate over the exact meaning of the Chinese translation issued by the U.S. Embassy. A senior administration official was quoted as saying "What the Chinese will choose to characterize as an apology, we would probably choose to characterize as an expression of regret or sorrow".

Chinese President Jiang Zemin accepted the expression of "very sorry" as consistent with the formal apology it had sought and released the Americans thereafter.

Aftermath

The crew of the EP-3 was released on April 11, 2001, and returned to their base at Whidbey Island via Honolulu, Hawaii, where they were subject to two days of intense debriefings, followed by a heroes' welcome. The pilot, Lt. Shane Osborn, was awarded the Distinguished Flying Cross for "heroism and extraordinary achievement" in flight. The J-8 pilot, Lt. Cdr. Wang Wei, was posthumously honored in China as a "Guardian of Territorial Airspace and Waters". His widow received a personal letter of condolence from President George W. Bush.

U.S. Navy engineers said the EP-3 could be repaired in 8–12 months, but China refused to allow it to be flown off Hainan island. The disassembled aircraft was released on July 3, 2001, and was returned to the United States by the Russian airline Polet in two Antonov An-124 Ruslans. The repairs were performed at Lockheed Martin in Marietta, Georgia, for reassembly and to make it flightworthy again.  The aircraft was then flown to L3 in Waco, Texas, for missionization as they were the main provider of EP-3 maintenance and modernization at the time. The aircraft returned to duty prior to 2013.

In addition to paying for the dismantling and shipping of the EP-3, the United States paid for the 11 days of food and lodging supplied by the Chinese government to the aircraft's crew, in the amount of $34,567. The Chinese had demanded one million dollars compensation from the U.S. for the lost J-8 and their pilot, but this was refused and no further negotiations were performed.

The incident occurred ten weeks after the inauguration of George W. Bush as president and was his first foreign policy crisis. Both sides were criticized after the event; the Chinese for making a bluff which was called without any real concessions from the American side other than the "Letter of the two sorries", and the U.S. first for being insensitive immediately after the event and later for issuing the letter rather than being more oppositional. The United States tried to be conciliatory in order to try to avoid Chinese objections to U.S. foreign policy, which became more important after the September 11 attacks and the beginning of the War on Terror.

Among the Chinese public, the incident created negative feelings towards the United States and increased feelings of Chinese nationalism.

After the collision, China's monitoring of reconnaissance flights became less aggressive for a period of time. As of 2011, flights of U.S. surveillance aircraft near the Chinese coastline continued as before the incident.

Hainan is currently the home of the People's Liberation Army Navy (PLAN) Hainan Submarine Base, an underground facility capable of supporting nuclear ballistic missile submarines. In August 2014, the U.S. protested when a Chinese Shenyang J-11BH came within  of a patrolling Boeing P-8 Poseidon aircraft and performed aerobatic maneuvers including a barrel roll.

See also

 List of accidents and incidents involving military aircraft (2000–09)

References

Citations

Sources

Further reading

 Garver, John W.   "Sino-American relations in 2001: the difficult accommodation of two great powers." International Journal 57.2 (2002): 283–310. online 
 

Espionage scandals and incidents
China–United States military relations
Signals intelligence
Aviation accidents and incidents in China
Aviation accidents and incidents in 2001
United States Navy in the 21st century
Diplomatic incidents
2001 in China
2001 in the United States
Conflicts in 2001
Military history of Hainan
George W. Bush administration controversies
Accidents and incidents involving United States Navy and Marine Corps aircraft
Lockheed P-3 Orion
April 2001 events in Asia
Espionage in China